The Tensas River National Wildlife Refuge is a protected wildlife area located west of the city of Tallulah in Madison, Tensas and Franklin parishes in northeastern Louisiana, USA.

Wildlife and habitat
The refuge is in located in the upper basin of the Tensas River, which is also the last documented home of the ivory-billed woodpecker. The refuge also has one of the last concentrations of the threatened Louisiana black bear. In 1907, former President Teddy Roosevelt hunted black bear just north of the refuge boundary and the famous "teddy bear" was introduced as a result of an incident during the hunt. Concentrations of ducks, geese, raptors, wading birds and shorebirds are present. Several rookeries are in the reserve.

In 1932, Mason Spencer, a state representative from the nearby town of Tallulah, armed with a gun and a hunting permit, shot a rare male ivory-billed woodpecker on a large tract of swamp forest land owned by the Singer Sewing Company. He killed the bird to prove to the Department of Wildlife and Fisheries that the creature existed in Madison Parish, as that had been a matter in dispute. As this particular woodpecker faced ultimate extinction, as early as 1938, the Audubon Society persuaded U.S. Senator Allen J. Ellender to work for the establishment of a proposed Tensas Swamp National Park to preserve sixty thousand acres of lands then owned by the Singer Company. Ellender's bill died in committee, but in 1998, Congress established the Tensas River National Wildlife Refuge.

See also
List of National Wildlife Refuges: Louisiana

References

External links
 Tensas River National Wildlife Refuge - official website
 Description at Gorp.com
 Louisiana Delta Tourism - Detailed description of the refuge and sites

Protected areas of Franklin Parish, Louisiana
Protected areas of Madison Parish, Louisiana
National Wildlife Refuges in Louisiana
Protected areas of Tensas Parish, Louisiana
Protected areas established in 1998
1998 establishments in Louisiana